Donald Malcolm Campbell,  (23 March 1921 – 4 January 1967) was a British speed record breaker who broke eight absolute world speed records on water and on land in the 1950s and 1960s. He remains the only person to set both world land and water speed records in the same year (1964). He died during a water speed record attempt at Coniston Water in the Lake District, England.

Family and personal life 
Donald Campbell was born at Canbury House, Kingston upon Thames, Surrey, the son of Malcolm, later Sir Malcolm Campbell, holder of 13 world speed records in the 1920s and 1930s in the Bluebird cars and boats, and his second wife, Dorothy Evelyn née Whittall.

Campbell attended St Peter's School, Seaford and Uppingham School. At the outbreak of the Second World War he volunteered for the Royal Air Force, but was unable to serve because of a case of childhood rheumatic fever. He joined Briggs Motor Bodies Ltd in West Thurrock, where he became a maintenance engineer. Subsequently, he was a shareholder in a small engineering company called Kine Engineering, producing machine tools. Following his father's death on New Year's Eve, 31 December 1948 and aided by Malcolm's chief engineer, Leo Villa, the younger Campbell strove to set speed records first on water and then land.

He married three times — to Daphne Harvey in 1945, producing daughter Georgina (Gina) Campbell, born on 19 September 1946; to Dorothy McKegg (1928–2008) in 1952; and to Tonia Bern (1928–2021) in December 1958, which lasted until his death in 1967. Campbell was intensely superstitious, hating the colour green, the number thirteen and believing nothing good ever happened on a Friday. He also had some interest in the paranormal, which he nurtured as a member of the Ghost Club.

Campbell was a restless man and seemed driven to emulate, if not surpass, his father's achievements. He was generally light-hearted and was generally, at least until his 1960 crash at the Bonneville Salt Flats, optimistic in his outlook.

Water speed records 

Campbell began his speed record attempts in the summer of 1949, using his father's old boat, Blue Bird K4, which he renamed Bluebird K4. His initial attempts that summer were unsuccessful, although he did come close to raising his father's existing record. The team returned to Coniston Water, Lancashire in 1950 for further trials.

In late 1950 and 1951, Bluebird K4 was modified to make it a "prop-rider" as opposed to her original immersed propeller configuration. This greatly reduced hydrodynamic drag, as the third planing point would now be the propeller hub, meaning one of the two propeller blades was always out of the water at high speed. She now sported two cockpits, the second one being for Leo Villa.

Bluebird K4 now had a chance of exceeding Sayres' record and also enjoyed success as a circuit racer, winning the Oltranza Cup in Italy in the spring of that year.

Along with Campbell, Britain had another potential contender for water speed record honours — John Cobb. Cobb was killed later that year, when Crusader broke up, during an attempt on the record. Campbell was devastated at Cobb's loss, but he resolved to build a new Bluebird boat to bring the water speed record back to Britain.

In early 1953, Campbell began development of his own advanced all-metal jet-powered Bluebird K7 hydroplane to challenge the record, by now held by the American prop rider hydroplane Slo-Mo-Shun IV.[1] Designed by Ken and Lew Norris, the K7 was a steel-framed, aluminium-bodied, three-point hydroplane with a Metropolitan-Vickers Beryl axial-flow turbojet engine, producing 3,500-pound-force (16 kN) of thrust.

Like Slo-Mo-Shun, but unlike Cobb's tricycle Crusader, the three planing points were arranged with two forward, on outrigged sponsons and one aft, in a "pickle-fork" layout, prompting Bluebirds early comparison to a blue lobster. K7 was of very advanced design and construction, and its load bearing steel space frame ultra rigid and stressed to 25 g (exceeding contemporary military jet aircraft).

The designation "K7" was derived from its Lloyd's unlimited rating registration. It was carried on a prominent white roundel on each sponson, underneath an infinity symbol. Bluebird K7 was the seventh boat registered at Lloyds in the "Unlimited" series.

Campbell set seven world water speed records in K7 between July 1955 and December 1964. The first of these marks was set at Ullswater on 23 July 1955, where he achieved a speed of  but only after many months of trials and a major redesign of Bluebirds forward sponson attachments points. Subsequently, four new marks were registered on Coniston Water, where Campbell and Bluebird became an annual fixture in the latter half of the 1950s, enjoying significant sponsorship from the Mobil oil company and then subsequently BP.

Campbell also made an attempt in the summer of 1957 at Canandaigua, New York, which failed due to lack of suitable calm water conditions. Bluebird K7 became a well known and popular attraction, and as well as her annual Coniston appearances, K7 was displayed extensively in the UK, United States, Canada and Europe, and then subsequently in Australia during Campbell's prolonged attempt on the land speed record in 1963–1964.

To extract more speed, and endow the boat with greater high-speed stability, in both pitch and yaw, K7 was subtly modified in the second half of the 1950s to incorporate more effective streamlining with a blown Perspex cockpit canopy and fluting to the lower part of the main hull. In 1958, a small wedge shaped tail fin, housing an arrester parachute, modified sponson fairings, that gave a significant reduction in forward aerodynamic lift, and a fixed hydrodynamic stabilising fin, attached to the transom to aid directional stability, and exert a marginal down-force on the nose were incorporated into the design to increase the safe operating envelope of the hydroplane.

Campbell was awarded the Order of the British Empire (CBE) in January 1957 for his water speed record breaking, and in particular his record at Lake Mead in the United States which earned him and Britain very positive acclaim.

Land speed record attempt 

It was after the Lake Mead water speed record success in 1955 that the seeds of Campbell's ambition to hold the land speed record as well were planted. The following year, the serious planning was under way — to build a car to break the land speed record, which then stood at  set by John Cobb in 1947.

The brothers were even more enthusiastic about the car than the boat and like all of his projects, Campbell wanted Bluebird CN7, to be the best of its type, a showcase of British engineering skills. The British motor industry, in the guise of Dunlop, BP, Smiths Industries, Lucas Automotive, Rubery Owen as well as many others, became heavily involved in the project to build the most advanced car the world had yet seen. CN7 was powered by a specially modified Bristol-Siddeley Proteus free-turbine engine of  driving all four wheels. Bluebird CN7 was designed to achieve 475–500 mph and was completed by the spring of 1960.

Following low-speed tests conducted at the Goodwood motor racing circuit in Sussex, in July, the CN7 was taken to the Bonneville Salt Flats in Utah, United States, scene of his father's last land speed record triumph, some 25 years earlier in September 1935. The trials initially went well, and various adjustments were made to the car. On the sixth run in CN7, Campbell lost control at over 360 mph and crashed. It was the car's tremendous structural integrity that saved his life. He was hospitalised with a fractured skull and a burst eardrum, as well as minor cuts and bruises, but CN7 was a write-off. Almost immediately, Campbell announced he was determined to have another go. Sir Alfred Owen, whose Rubery Owen industrial group had built CN7, offered to rebuild it for him. That single decision was to have a profound influence on the rest of Campbell's life. His original plan had been to break the land speed record at over 400 mph in 1960, return to Bonneville the following year to really bump up the speed to something near to 500 mph, get his seventh water speed record with K7 and then retire, as undisputed champion of speed and perhaps just as important, secure in the knowledge that he was worthy of his father's legacy.

Campbell decided not to go back to Utah for the new trials. BP offered to find another venue and eventually after a long search, Lake Eyre, in South Australia, was chosen. By the summer of 1962, Bluebird CN7 was rebuilt, some nine months later than Campbell had hoped. It was essentially the same car, but with the addition of a large stabilising tail fin and a reinforced fibreglass cockpit cover. At the end of 1962, CN7 was shipped out to Australia ready for the new attempt. Low-speed runs had just started when the rains came. The course was compromised and further rain meant, that by May 1963, Lake Eyre was flooded to a depth of 3 inches, causing the attempt to be abandoned. Campbell was heavily criticised in the press for alleged time wasting and mismanagement of the project, despite the fact that he could hardly be held responsible for the unprecedented weather.

Although the "car" did not conform to FIA (Federation Internationale de L'Automobile) regulations, that stipulated it had to be wheel-driven and have a minimum of four wheels, in the eyes of the world, Breedlove was now the fastest man on Earth.

Campbell returned to Australia in March 1964, but the Lake Eyre course failed to fulfil the early promise it had shown in 1962 and there were further spells of rain. BP pulled out as his main sponsor after a dispute, but he was able to secure backing from Australian oil company Ampol.

The track never properly dried out and Campbell was forced to make the best of the conditions. Finally, in July 1964, he was able to post some speeds that approached the record. The surreal moment was captured in a number of well-known images by photographers, including Australia's Jeff Carter. Campbell was bitterly disappointed with the record as the vehicle had been designed for much higher speeds. He resented the fact that it had all been so difficult. "We've made it — we got the bastard at last," was his reaction to the success. Campbell's 403.1 mph represented the official land speed record.

In 1969, after Campbell's fatal accident, his widow, Tonia Bern-Campbell negotiated a deal with Lynn Garrison, president of Craig Breedlove and Associates, that would see Craig Breedlove run Bluebird on Bonneville's Salt Flats. This concept was cancelled when the parallel Spirit of America supersonic car project failed to find support.

Double records 
Campbell now planned to go after the water speed record one more time with Bluebird K7 — to do what he had aimed for so many years earlier, during the initial planning stages of CN7 — break both records in the same year. He had become the first, and so far only, person to set both land and water speed records in the same year.

Campbell's land speed record was short-lived, because FIA rule changes meant that pure jet cars would be eligible to set records from October 1964. Campbell's  speed on his final Lake Eyre run remained the highest speed achieved by a wheel-driven car until 2001; Bluebird CN7 is now on display at the National Motor Museum at Beaulieu in Hampshire, England, its potential only partly realised.

Rocket car plans and final water speed record attempt

Bluebird Mach 1.1

Campbell decided a massive jump in speed was called for following his successful 1964 land speed record attempt in Bluebird CN7. Norris Brothers were requested to undertake a design study. Bluebird Mach 1.1 was a design for a rocket-powered supersonic land speed record car. Campbell chose a lucky date to hold a press conference at the Charing Cross Hotel on 7 July 1965 to announce his future record breaking plans:

Bluebird Mach 1.1 was to be rocket-powered. Ken Norris had calculated using rocket motors would result in a vehicle with very low frontal area, greater density, and lighter weight than if he were to employ a jet engine. Bluebird Mach 1.1 would also be a relatively compact and simple design. Norris specified two off-the-shelf Bristol Siddeley BS.605 rocket engines. The 605 had been developed as a rocket-assisted take-off engine for military aircraft and was fuelled with kerosene, using hydrogen peroxide as the oxidiser. Each engine was rated at  thrust.

Final record attempt
To increase publicity for his rocket car venture, in the spring of 1966, Campbell decided to try once more for a water speed record. Bluebird K7 was fitted with a lighter and more powerful Bristol Orpheus engine, taken from a Folland Gnat jet aircraft, which developed  of thrust. The modified boat was taken back to Coniston in the first week of November 1966. The trials did not go well. The weather was appalling, and K7 suffered an engine failure when her air intakes collapsed and debris was drawn into the engine. By the middle of December, some high-speed runs were made, in excess of  but still well below Campbell's existing record. Problems with Bluebirds fuel system meant that the engine could not reach full speed, and so would not develop maximum power. Eventually, by the end of December, after further modifications to her fuel system, and the replacement of a fuel pump, the fuel starvation problem was fixed, and Campbell awaited better weather to mount an attempt.

Death

On 4 January 1967, weather conditions were finally suitable for an attempt. Campbell commenced the first run of his last record attempt at just after 8:45 am. Bluebird moved slowly out towards the middle of the lake, where she paused briefly as Campbell lined her up. With a deafening blast of power, Campbell now applied full throttle and Bluebird began to surge forward. She entered the measured kilometre at 8:46 am. Campbell lifted his foot from the throttle about 3/10 of a second before passing the southern kilometre marker. As Bluebird left the measured kilometre, Keith Harrison and Eric Shaw in a course boat at the southern end of the measured kilometre both noticed that she was very light around the bows, riding on her front stabilising fins. Her planing trim was no worse than she had exhibited when equipped with the Beryl engine, but it was markedly different from that observed by Leo Villa at the northern end of the kilometre, when she was under full acceleration. Campbell had made his usual commentary throughout the run.

Campbell's words on his first run were, via radio intercom:

Instead of refuelling and waiting for the wash of this run to subside, Campbell decided to make the return run immediately. This was not an unprecedented diversion from normal practice, as Campbell had used the advantage presented; i.e., no encroachment of water disturbances on the measured kilometre by the quick turnaround in many previous runs. The second run was even faster once severe tramping subsided on the run-up from Peel Island (caused by the water-brake disturbance). Bluebird was now experiencing bouncing episodes of the starboard sponson with increasing ferocity. Engine flame-out then occurred and, shorn of thrust nose-down momentum, K7 experienced a gliding episode in strong ground effect with increasing angle-of-attack, before completely leaving the water at her static stability pitch-up limit of 5.2°. Bluebird then executed an almost complete backflip (~ 320° and slightly off-axis) before plunging into the water (port sponson marginally in advance of the starboard), approximately 230 metres from the end of the measured kilometre. The boat then cartwheeled across the water before coming to rest. The impact broke K7 forward of the air intakes (where Campbell was sitting) and the main hull sank shortly afterwards.

Mr Whoppit, Campbell's teddy bear mascot, was found among the floating debris and the pilot's helmet was recovered. Royal Navy divers made efforts to find and recover the body but, although the wreck of K7 was found, they called off the search, after two weeks, without locating his body. Campbell's body was finally located in 2001.

Campbell's last words, during a 31-second transmission, on his final run were, via radio intercom:

The cause of the crash has been variously attributed to several possible causes (or a combination of these causes):
These factors have since been found to be not particularly important: The water brake was used well to the south of the measured distance, and only from approx. . The area in the centre of the course where Bluebird was travelling at peak speed on her return run was flat calm, and not disturbed by the wash from the first run, which had not had time to be reflected back on the course. Campbell knew this and, as discussed previously, adopted his well-practised, "quick turn-around" strategy.
 Bluebird may have exceeded its aerodynamic static stability limit, complicated by the additional destabilising influences of loss of engine thrust. There is also evidence to point to the fact that K7's dynamic stability limit had been exceeded. The cause(s) of the engine flame-out cannot be established unequivocally. It could have been due to fuel starvation, damage to some ancillary structural element associated with engine function (following the worst bouncing episode), disturbance of the airstream into the intakes during the pitching episodes, or indeed a combination of all three. Further evidence of lost engine thrust may be seen in both cinematographic and still film recordings of the latter part of the run — as Bluebird left the water, jet exhaust from a functioning engine would have severely disturbed the water surface; no such disturbance or accompanying spray is evident. Also, close examination of such records show no evidence to the effect that the water brake was deployed.
 Analysis of film footage suggests that Bluebird may have hit a duck during test runs, which may have affected the aerodynamic shape of the boat, making it harder to control at extreme speeds.

On 28 January 1967, Campbell was posthumously awarded the Queen's Commendation for Brave Conduct "for courage and determination in attacking the world water speed record."

Recovery of Bluebird K7 and Campbell's body
The wreckage of Campbell's craft was recovered by the Bluebird Project between October 2000, when the first sections were raised, and May 2001, when Campbell's body was recovered. The largest section, comprising approximately two-thirds of the centre hull, was raised on 8 March 2001. The project began when diver Bill Smith was inspired to look for the wreck after hearing the Marillion song "Out of This World" (from the album Afraid of Sunlight), which was written about Campbell and Bluebird.

The recovered wreck revealed that the water brake had deployed after the accident as a result of stored accumulator pressure; Campbell would not have had time to deploy the relatively slow-moving brake as the boat flipped out of control. The boat still contained fuel in the engine fuel lines, discounting the fuel-starvation theory. The wreckage all evidenced an impact from left to right, wiping the whole front of the boat off in that direction. Campbell's lower harness mounts had failed and were found to be effectively useless. Further dives recovered various parts of K7, which had separated from the main hull when it broke up on impact.

Part of Campbell's body was finally located just over two months later and recovered from the lake on 28 May 2001, still wearing his blue nylon overalls. On the night before his death, while playing cards he had drawn the queen and the ace of spades. Reflecting upon the fact that Mary, Queen of Scots had drawn the same two cards the night before she was beheaded, he told his mechanics, who were playing cards with him, that he had a fearful premonition that he was going to "get the chop". It was not possible to determine the cause of Campbell's death, though a consultant engineer giving evidence to the inquest said that the force of the impact could have caused him to be decapitated. When his remains were found, his skull was not present and is still missing.

Campbell was buried in Coniston Cemetery on 12 September 2001 after his coffin was carried down the lake, and through the measured kilometre, on a launch, one last time. A funeral service was then held at St Andrew's Church in Coniston, after an earlier, and positive DNA examination had been carried out. The funeral was attended by his widow, Tonia, daughter Gina, other members of his family, members of his former team and admirers. The funeral was overshadowed in the media by coverage of the 9/11 attacks in the United States. 

Campbell's sister, Jean Wales, had been against the recovery of her brother's body out of respect for his stated wish that, in the event of something going wrong, "Skipper and boat stay together". Jean Wales did, however, remain in daily telephone contact with project leader Bill Smith during the recovery operation in anticipation of any news of her brother's remains. When Campbell was buried in Coniston Cemetery on 12 September 2001 she did not attend the service. Steve Hogarth, lead singer for Marillion, was present at the funeral and performed the song "Out of This World" solo.

Legacy
Between them, Campbell and his father had set 11 speed records on water and 10 on land.

The story of Campbell's last attempt at the water speed record on Coniston Water was told in the BBC television film Across the Lake in 1988, with Anthony Hopkins as Campbell. Nine years earlier, Robert Hardy had played Campbell's father, Sir Malcolm Campbell, in the BBC2 Playhouse television drama "Speed King"; both were written by Roger Milner and produced by Innes Lloyd. In 2003, the BBC showed a documentary reconstruction of Campbell's fateful water-speed record attempt in an episode of Days That Shook the World. It featured a mixture of modern reconstruction and original film footage. All of the original colour clips were taken from a film capturing the event, Campbell at Coniston by John Lomax, a local amateur filmmaker from Wallasey, England. Lomax's film won awards worldwide in the late 1960s for recording the final weeks of Campbell's life.

In 1956, Campbell was surprised by Eamonn Andrews for the seventh episode of the new television show This Is Your Life.

An English Heritage blue plaque commemorates Campbell and his father at Canbury School, Kingston Hill, Kingston upon Thames, where they lived.

In the village of Coniston, the Ruskin Museum has a display of Campbell memorabilia, and the Bristol Orpheus engine recovered in 2001 is also displayed. The engine's casing is mostly missing, having acted as a sacrificial anode in its time underwater, but the internals are preserved. Campbell's helmet from the ill-fated run is also on display.

On 23 March 2021, organised by the Ruskin Museum, two Hawk jets of the Royal Air Force staged a fly past over the Lake District to mark the 100th anniversary of Campbell's birth. As they flew over Coniston Water, the jets dipped their wings in salute, in a repeat of a gesture carried out by an Avro Vulcan on the day after his death. Campbell's daughter, Gina, laid flowers on the surface of the lake as the jets flew overhead.

Restoration

On 7 December 2006, Campbell's daughter, Gina Campbell, formally gifted the recovered wreckage of Bluebird K7 to the Ruskin Museum in Coniston on behalf of the Campbell Family Heritage Trust. In agreement with the trust and the museum, Bill Smith is to organise the restoration of the boat, which is now under way. Now the property of the Ruskin Museum, the intention is to rebuild K7 back to running order circa 4 January 1967. Smith has said that this will take an undisclosed number of years to accomplish. Gina Campbell commented: "I've decided to secure the future of Bluebird for the people of Coniston, the Ruskin Museum and the people of the world". Museum Director Vicky Slowe spoke of Gina Campbell's generosity and said that: "Bill Smith has assured us he can get Bluebird fully conserved and reconfigured at no cost to the museum. As of 2008, K7 is being fully restored by The Bluebird Project, to a very high standard of working condition in North Shields, Tyne and Wear, using a significant proportion of her original fabric, but with a replacement BS Orpheus engine of the same type albeit incorporating many original components."

As of May 2009, permission had been given for a one-off set of proving trials of Bluebird on Coniston Water, where she would be tested to a safe speed for demonstration purposes only. There was no fixed date given for completion of Bluebird K7 or the trials. Upon restoration, it was planned that K7 would be housed in her own purpose-built wing at the Ruskin Museum in Coniston.

On 20 March 2018 the restoration was featured on the BBC's The One Show, when it was announced that Bluebird K7 would return to the water on Loch Fad, on the Isle of Bute in Scotland, in August 2018 for handling trials.

Refloating and initial trials
In August 2018, initial restoration work on Bluebird was completed. She was transported to Loch Fad where she was refloated on 4 August 2018. For safety reasons, there are no plans to attempt to reach any higher speeds.

World speed records established by Campbell

References

Further reading

External links

 
 https://www.telegraph.co.uk/news/obituaries/1556039/Jean-Wales.html

1921 births
1967 deaths
Bonneville 300 MPH Club members
Commanders of the Order of the British Empire
English people of Scottish descent
English racing drivers
British motorboat racers
Filmed deaths in motorsport
Land speed record people
Motorboat racers who died while racing
People from Kingston upon Thames
People from West Thurrock
People educated at Uppingham School
People educated at St Peter's School, Seaford
Recipients of the Queen's Commendation for Brave Conduct
Segrave Trophy recipients
Sport deaths in England
Water speed records